is a passenger railway station in the city of Funabashi, Chiba, Japan, operated by the third sector Hokusō Railway.

Lines

Station layout
This station consists of one ground-level island platform and one side platform serving three tracks, with the station building built above.

Platforms

Adjacent stations

History
Komuro Station was opened on 8 March 1979. On 17 July 2010 a station numbering system was introduced to the Hokusō Line, with the station designated HS11.

Passenger statistics
In fiscal 2018, the station was used by an average of 3,984 passengers daily.

Surrounding area
 Funabashi City Komuro Public Hall
 
 
Chiba New Town

See also
 List of railway stations in Japan

References

External links

 Hokusō Line station information 

Railway stations in Japan opened in 1979
Railway stations in Chiba Prefecture
Hokusō Line
Railway stations in highway medians
Funabashi